Alan O Sullivan (born 1987) is a Gaelic footballer from County Kerry. He has played with Kerry at every level and with his club side Tuosist and later Dr Crokes.

Club 

At club level he helped Tuosist to the County Novice title in 2008.

He later joined Dr Crokes in Killarney. It was a successful move as in his first season he won a Kerry Senior Football Championship in 2013, he later added a Munster Senior Club Football Championship. He won play a part as the club won three titles in a row between 2016-2018, added Munster titles in 2016 and 2018. On St Patricks Day 2017 he was part of the Corkes team who won the All-Ireland Senior Club Football Championship in Croke Park.

Minor 

He first played with the Kerry GAA minor team in 2004 winning a Munster Championship as a sub, he was also part of the panel that lost the All Ireland final to Tyrone. He was a regular member of the team in 2005 but had little success.

Under 21 

He then moved on to the Under 21 team, he played in 2006 & 07 but had little success. In 2008 he played a key role at midfield as Kerry won a first Munster title since 2002 and later a first All Ireland title since 1998 after overcoming Kildare.

Junior 

In 2007 he joined the Junior side but had little success. Following on from his Under 21 success in 2008 he again played with the Junior team winning a Munster title, Kerry later lost out to Roscommon in the All Ireland semi final. After no success in 2009 Kerry were back as Munster Champions in 2010 with O Sullivan again playing a key role, they later lost out to Sigo in the All Ireland final. After playing no part in 2011 he won a third Munster Championship and later a first All Ireland at Junior level after beating Mayo in the final.

Senior 

Despite being one of the top young players in Kerry, his only senior appearance came during the 2010 National Football League.

References
 http://www.terracetalk.com/kerry-football/player/93/Alan-OSullivan

1987 births
Living people
Kerry inter-county Gaelic footballers
Tuosist Gaelic footballers
Dr Crokes Gaelic footballers